DCE may refer to:

Science 

 Dichloroethanes, organic solvents
 Dichloroethenes, also called dichloroethylene, organic solvents
 Dynamic contrast enhanced, a type of perfusion MRI

Computing 

 Data circuit-terminating equipment, also called data communication(s) equipment or data carrier equipment
 Data Center Ethernet
 Distributed Computing Environment, a specification from The Open Group
 Dead-code elimination, a kind of compiler optimization
 Digital Consumer Enablement, a non-neutral term for Digital rights management

Organisations 

 Delhi College of Engineering, University of Delhi, India
 Dalian Commodity Exchange
 Drum Corps Europe

Other uses 

 Daly Cherry-Evans
 Digital currency exchanger